Acontia  gloriosa is a moth of the family Noctuidae. It was first described by George Hamilton Kenrick in 1917 and is found in Madagascar.

The forewings of this species are coppery, shot with purple, the hindwings pale ochreous. The wingspan of this moth is 40 mm.

References

gloriosa
Moths described in 1917
Moths of Madagascar
Owlet moths of Africa